Cruising Bar 2 is a Canadian comedy film, directed by Robert Ménard and Michel Côté, and released in 2008. A sequel to the 1989 film Cruising Bar, the film stars Côté as the same four separate characters he played in the original film, now dealing with much more middle-aged sexual and relationship issues.

Gérard's wife Gertrude (Véronique Le Flaguais) has finally had enough of his constant infidelity, and is filing for divorce; Patrice is in a downward spiral after his girlfriend breaks up with him; Jean-Jacques is struggling with erectile dysfunction issues which have led his psychiatrist to suggest that he might actually be gay; Serge, perennially unlucky in love, tries Internet dating which may finally change his life for the better.

The film's cast also includes Marie-France Duquette, Chantal Dauphinais, Lise Roy and Hélène Major.

Awards
Côté received a Jutra Award nomination for Best Actor at the 11th Jutra Awards, and the film's make-up team (Adrien Morot, Réjean Goderre, Marifrance Guy, Bruno Gatien, Nathalie Trépanier) won the Genie Award for Best Makeup at the 29th Genie Awards.

It was the top-grossing Quebec film of 2008, and was awarded Telefilm Canada's Guichet d'or and Québec Cinéma's Billet d'or.

References

External links

2008 films
Canadian sex comedy films
2000s French-language films
Films set in Quebec
Films shot in Quebec
Films directed by Robert Ménard
2000s sex comedy films
2008 comedy films
French-language Canadian films
2000s Canadian films